Arkwright Town, commonly referred to as Arkwright, is a village in Sutton cum Duckmanton, North East Derbyshire, England, that is notable for having moved its location in the early 1990s. Despite its name, the village has no official town status.

Located between Chesterfield and Bolsover on the A632 road, it was formerly a coal mining village. Arkwright Colliery closed in 1988 and it was then discovered that the community was threatened by emissions of methane gas that caused some of its houses to be evacuated. The whole village was owned by British Coal and a decision was made in cooperation with Derbyshire County Council to transfer ownership of the 52 properties to a housing trust, construct a new village of 56 properties to the north of the site affected by methane, and move all the residents. Construction was completed by 1995 when the old Arkwright Town was demolished. Part of the deal with British Coal included the use of open cast mining on a 100-acre site which began in November 1993 and continued until c. 2005.

A new nature walk was established in 2010 following routes once used as railway lines.

See also
Arkwright Town railway station
Arkwright Town Junction
Adelphi Canal

References

Further reading
"King Coal Moves An English Village, But Can Its Spirit Follow?" AP News August 30, 1995.
Arkwright Colliery, 1938-1988
Arkwright Colliery Closure – 30th anniversary

Villages in Derbyshire
Populated places established in 1995
Environmental disaster ghost towns
Mining communities in England
North East Derbyshire District